Beninese American are Americans of Beninese descent. According to the census of 2000, in the United States there are only 605 Americans of Beninese origin. However, because since the first half of the eighteenth century to nineteenth many slaves were exported from Benin to the present United States, the number of African Americans with one or more Beninese ancestors could be much higher. The number of slaves from Bight of Benin exported to present United States exceeded 6,000 people, although this might consist not only in Benin, but also washes the shores of Ghana, Togo and Nigeria. It is also important to note that they were slaves from modern Benin (along with the Haitian immigrants arrived in the United States in the late nineteenth century), who exchanged voodoo practices with Francophone African descendants in Louisiana. Currently, there are Beninese communities in cities such as Chicago or Washington D.C. and in other states as New York. As of 2021, there were over  500 Beninese immigrants in the town of Austin, Minnesota.

History
The first people from present-day Benin to came to the modern United States were slaves and arrived to this country in the colonial period. Most of the slaves of Bight of Benin that hailed from Benin were imported to South Carolina (36%), Virginia (23%), Gulf Coast (28%) and Florida (9,8%). The top three picked up a few thousand slaves of this Straits (Florida only received 698 slaves from Bight of Benin). Many slaves were imported to Louisiana and Alabama (where was famous the Clotilda slave ship case, which took from 110 to 160 slaves from Dahomey to Mobile in 1859. Some of these people were Cudjo Lewis (ca. 1840 – 1935) and Redoshi  (c. 1848 – 1937), considered to be the last persons born on African soil to have been enslaved in the United States when slavery was still lawful), in the Gulf Coast. It was in Louisiana where the presence of slaves from modern-day Benin was more notable. Indeed, between 1719 and 1731, most of the slaves who came to Louisiana came directly from Benin, through of boats as Duc du Maine. The slaves belonged, mainly, to the Fon ethnic group, but many slaves also were of ethnic groups such as Nago (Yoruba subgroup, although they were slavered mainly by Spanish settlers, when the Louisiana was Spanish) -, Ewe, and Gen. Many of the slaves imported to the modern United States since Benin were sold by the King of Dahomey, in the Whydah.   However, not all the slaves sold in day-present Benin were of there: Many were from other places, but were captured by Dahomeyan warriors.   The native slaves from modern Benin came from places such as Porto-Novo, from where were brought to the port of Ouidah, place in the which was made the slave shopping. In this place were sold many of the slavers that were brought to the United States.

The slaves brought with them their cultural practices, languages, and religious beliefs rooted in spirit and ancestor worship, which were key elements of Louisiana Voodoo.  Also Haitians, who migrated Louisiana since the late nineteenth century and also contributed to Voodoo of this state, have the Beninese origin as one of its main origins.

During the twentieth century, most of the Beninese people migrating to foreign countries were headed to Europe, mainly to France and Belgium, because Benin shares with them the same language (as Benin was a French colony since late of nineteenth to 1960), the costs to migrate to these countries were lower than the costs found in countries like the United States and the availability of visas.

However, in the 1980s, some Beninese began migrating to New York, attracted by educational and employment opportunities found in this state. The Benineses who arrived to New York for live there, worked usually in the manufacture or sale of African clothing and hairbraiding, as happened with other West African groups in the state. However, it was not until the 90s when the Beninese population grew significantly in the United States compared to previous Beninese immigration in this country. It was from this decade when the Beninese began to feel attracted to Chicago and other big cities. They promoted the emigration of relatives and friends to these cities. 
  
As in New York, many Beninese women also worked in hairbraiding elsewhere in the United States. In the late 1990s many other Beninese people from Benin and Europe immigrated to United States in one second wave, pursuing also better working conditions and study, well as a graduate education.

Demography
Currently, there Beninese communities in cities such as Chicago or Washington D.C. and in other states as New York and Minnesota. So, great Beninese communities exist in Chicago, where, according to Bobby Dagnon, president of the Association of Beninese of Illinois, the beninese community is growing very rapidly.

Most Beninese who migrate to the United States do so seeking better educational and employment opportunities. Now, many U.S. Beninese immigrants work more than 80 hours a week with the aim, in addition to earn enough money to survive, help their  relatives who want to emigrate to the USA.

Organizations
Like other ethnic groups in United States, people of Beninese origin formed organizations and associations to help to other Benineses people in United States.

In 1984 was funded The Association of Beninese Nationals in the U.S.A. (ARBEUA) in Washington D.C. It aims to help socially, culturally and economically (to poorest members) to the U.S. Beninese population.  The organization has a National General Assembly and the Executive Board to meet each other and organize cultural activities in the capital of the United States. Over time, some U.S. Beninese communities created some new sections of the organization, as in the case of Beninese community of Chicago, whose basic functions are to establish social and cultural events, such as monthly parties and an annual celebration of the Day Independence on August 1.  Other Beninese organization is The Association of Beninese of Illinois, a non-profit organization established in 2008 and whose objective is to meet the needs of Benineses in Illinois, especially in Chicago and surrounding areas. The organization also tries to establish a good relationship between the Americans and the Benineses of that state.

Others Beninese associations in United States are: the Union des Béninois des États-Unis pour le Développement ("Unión de benineses en USA for the development"), the Association des Béninois de la Caroline du Nord, USA (Association of Benineses of North Carolina) and the Association Béninois Indiana (Whose goal are:  educate children so that they know about Benin, creating institutions to promote mutual understanding and develop union with other communities of Benin in the United States for the implementation of joint projects).

The Benineses in United States have also the University of Benin Alumni Association, North America, in Westchester, New York.

The Beninese community regularly interact with other communities from West Africa, with which they have cultural ties, such as the Malian, Ivorian, Senegalese or Togolese. In some cities, many Benineses participate in tontine groups, small cooperatives whose purpose is to raise money, through verbal agreement among their members. In the tontine, its members must contribute a fixed amount of money regularly. Thus, these cooperatives allow U.S. Beninese simultaneously collect an amount of money. The Beninese Americans are also the founders of African Hairbraiding Association of Illinois in 2001, to achieve another form of licensing pressing to state for them.

Cultural contributions

Benin's slaves brought to Louisiana the voodoo, followed then by Haitian migrants arrived to that state in the late nineteenth century. Their knowledge of herbs, poisons, and the ritual creation of charms and amulets, intended to protect oneself or harm others, became key elements of Louisiana Voodoo.

Notable people
Lucille Clifton
Angélique Kidjo
Djimon Hounsou

See also
 Hannibal (slave ship)
 Clotilda (slave ship)
 Beninese people in France
 Beninese Canadians
 Beninese people in Italy
 Beninese people in Belgium
 Beninese people in Germany
 Beninese people in the Netherlands
 Beninese people in the United Kingdom
 Beninese people in Switzerland

Notes

References

External links 
 Benin diaspora USA (in French)

 
 
West Africans in the United States